Myanmar Digest is a weekly newspaper published in Burma.

See also
List of newspapers in Burma

Weekly newspapers published in Myanmar